Denis Fetahović (Cyrillic: Дeниc Фeтaxoвић, born 29 December 1979) is a Montenegrin retired football defender who last played for FK Jedinstvo Bijelo Polje.

Club career
Born in Nikšić, he has been a regular player in the First League of Serbia and Montenegro, first playing four seasons with his home-town side FK Sutjeska, and, afterwards, with Serbian FK Javor Ivanjica during the 2005–06 season.  After the relegation of Javor to the Second league in 2006, he stayed another season in Ivanjica before returning to Montenegro in summer 2007 to continue his career with FK Bokelj.  In 2008, he signed with FK Jedinstvo Bijelo Polje playing in the Montenegrin First League.

References

1979 births
Living people
Footballers from Nikšić
Association football defenders
Serbia and Montenegro footballers
Montenegrin footballers
FK Sutjeska Nikšić players
FK Javor Ivanjica players
FK Bokelj players
FK Jedinstvo Bijelo Polje players
First League of Serbia and Montenegro players
Serbian First League players
Montenegrin First League players
Montenegrin Second League players